Mission: Impossible III (abbreviated as M:i:III)  is a 2006 American action spy film directed by J. J. Abrams in his directorial debut and produced by, and starring, Tom Cruise, from a screenplay by Abrams, Alex Kurtzman and Roberto Orci. It is the sequel to Mission: Impossible (1996) and Mission: Impossible 2 (2000) and the third installment in the Mission: Impossible film series. It also stars Philip Seymour Hoffman, Ving Rhames, Michelle Monaghan, Billy Crudup, Jonathan Rhys Meyers, Keri Russell, Maggie Q and Laurence Fishburne. In Mission: Impossible III, retired Impossible Missions Force (IMF) agent and trainer Ethan Hunt (Cruise) is forced to return to active duty to capture elusive arms dealer Owen Davian (Hoffman).

Development for a third Mission: Impossible film began in 2002, with David Fincher slated to direct; he and his eventual replacement Joe Carnahan both departed by 2004, both citing creative differences. Abrams was hired months later at the behest of Cruise, who was a fan of Abrams' Alias (2001–2006), but this further delayed production on the film due to Abrams' contractual obligations for Alias and Lost (2006–2010), and caused prospective cast additions Kenneth Branagh, Carrie-Anne Moss, and Scarlett Johansson to depart the film. Principal photography began in July 2005 and lasted until that October, with filming locations including Shanghai, Berlin, Rome, Los Angeles, and the Vatican City.

Mission: Impossible III premiered at the Tribeca Film Festival on April 26, 2006, and was released in the United States by Paramount Pictures on May 5, 2006. It received generally positive reviews from critics, with praise for its pace, direction, Cruise and Hoffman's performance, action sequences and dark tone, which was considered as an improvement over its predecessor. The film grossed $398 million worldwide, becoming the eighth-highest-grossing film of 2006. The sequel, Mission: Impossible – Ghost Protocol, was released in 2011.

Plot

Ethan Hunt has retired from IMF fieldwork. He trains recruits and has settled down with his fiancée, nurse Julia Meade, who is unaware of his real job. He is approached by IMF Assistant Director of Operations John Musgrave about a special mission to rescue one of his protégés, Lindsey Farris, who was captured while investigating arms dealer Owen Davian. Musgrave has already prepared a team for Ethan: Declan Gormley, Zhen Lei, and old partner Luther Stickell. The team rescues Lindsey in Berlin and collects two damaged laptops. As they flee, Ethan discovers an explosive pellet implanted in Lindsey's head. Before he can disable it with a defibrillator, it kills her.

IMF Director Theodore Brassel reprimands Ethan and Musgrave. Ethan learns that Lindsey mailed him a postcard before her capture and discovers a magnetic microdot under the stamp. IMF technician Benji Dunn recovers enough data from the laptops to determine Davian will be in Vatican City to obtain a mysterious object codenamed the "Rabbit's Foot." Ethan plans an unofficial mission to capture Davian. Before leaving, he and Julia have an impromptu wedding at her hospital's chapel. The team successfully infiltrates the Vatican and captures Davian. On the return flight to the U.S., Davian is exceedingly calm under Ethan's brutal interrogation. After landing, Ethan learns that Lindsey's microdot contains a warning about Brassel and Davian.

The convoy taking them across the Chesapeake Bay Bridge–Tunnel is ambushed by mercenaries who extract Davian. Realizing Julia is also in danger, Ethan races to Julia's hospital to discover her already kidnapped. Davian calls Ethan and gives him 48 hours to recover the Rabbit's Foot in exchange for Julia's life. Before he can move, Ethan is apprehended by the IMF and questioned for the loss of Davian. While in the room as part of Ethan's interrogation, Musgrave discreetly mouths that the Rabbit's Foot is located in Shanghai and assists Ethan in escaping. Ethan travels to Shanghai and meets his team, who Musgrave sent there under the guise of another operation. Ethan obtains the Rabbit's Foot and delivers it to Davian, who tranquilizes him and implants in his head a micro-explosive similar to the one that killed Lindsey.

After the operation, Ethan sees Davian holding Julia at gunpoint. Despite Ethan asserting that he brought the real Rabbit's Foot, Davian shoots Julia and leaves. Musgrave arrives and reveals himself as the actual IMF traitor; he explains that Julia is still alive, and that Davian disguised his translator as Ethan's wife for failing to protect him in the Vatican and shot her dead. The ruse was to confirm the authenticity of the Rabbit's foot. Musgrave was working with Davian to obtain the Rabbit's Foot so that IMF would have cause to launch a preemptive strike against the terrorists Davian works for. Ethan knocks Musgrave unconscious, frees himself, and uses Musgrave's phone to obtain Julia's location.

With help from Benji, Ethan locates Julia but encounters Davian, who arms the explosive in Ethan's head. Ethan fights and kills Davian before freeing Julia. He jury-rigs an impromptu defibrillator to deactivate the explosive, telling Julia to bring him back and teaching her how to shoot a gun. Julia kills a henchman, then Musgrave, who is carrying the Rabbit's Foot, before resuscitating Ethan, who finally explains his IMF career to her. Back in the US, Brassel and others congratulate Ethan as he leaves for his honeymoon with Julia.

Cast

 Tom Cruise as Ethan Hunt, an agent of the Impossible Missions Force (IMF) and protagonist of the film.
 Ving Rhames as Luther Stickell, a computer hacker and IMF agent.
 Philip Seymour Hoffman as Owen Davian, an arms dealer who looks for the Rabbit's Foot.
 Michelle Monaghan as Julia Meade, Ethan's fiancée and a nurse.
 Maggie Q as Zhen Lei, an IMF Agent who assists Ethan at the Vatican and Shanghai.
 Jonathan Rhys Meyers as Declan Gormley, an IMF Agent who assists Ethan at Vatican & Shanghai.
 Billy Crudup as John Musgrave, the IMF Assistant Director who recruits Ethan to find Farris, later to be found working with Davian
 Keri Russell as Lindsey Farris, an IMF agent held captive at Berlin.
 Simon Pegg as Benjamin "Benji" Dunn, an IMF agent and technician.
 Laurence Fishburne as Theodore Brassel, the IMF Director who recruits Ethan to find Davian.
 Bahar Soomekh as Davian's translator
 Jeff Chase as Davian's bodyguard
 Michael Berry Jr. as Julia's kidnapper
 Eddie Marsan as Brownway
 Bellamy Young as Rachael
 Carla Gallo as Beth
 Greg Grunberg as Kevin
 Rose Rollins as Ellie
 Sasha Alexander as Melissa Meade
 Aaron Paul as Rick Meade

Production

Development

In 2002, director David Fincher was slated to direct the next installment of the Mission: Impossible film series for a summer of 2004 release date. Fincher, however, dropped out in favor of another film, later citing creative differences over the direction of the series. Replacing Fincher was director Joe Carnahan, who worked on developing the film for 15 months. Under his involvement, the film was to feature "Kenneth Branagh playing a guy who's based on Timothy McVeigh," as well as Carrie-Anne Moss and Scarlett Johansson in other roles. Thandiwe Newton was offered to reprise her role as Nyah Nordoff-Hall from Mission: Impossible 2 but she declined, in order to concentrate on her family. Her role in the story was later changed to a new character named Leah Quint, who would have been played by Moss. However, once J.J. Abrams took over directing the project, the character was scrapped.

After a dispute over the film's tone, Carnahan quit in July 2004. Tom Cruise then called J. J. Abrams, offering the directorial role for the film after having binge-watched the first two seasons of Alias. Abrams ultimately signed on and production was delayed a year due to his contractual obligations with Alias and Lost. During this time, Branagh, Moss, and Johansson departed from the project because of the many delays in production. Ricky Gervais was cast as Benjamin Dunn, but due to production delays, Gervais left the project due to scheduling conflicts with For Your Consideration (2006). On June 8, 2005, Paramount Pictures gave the film the green-light after a new cast of actors was hired and the film's budget was redeveloped, and Cruise took a major pay cut.

Filming
Principal photography began in Rome, Italy on July 12, 2005, and ended in October. Location filming took place in China (Shanghai and Xitang), Germany (Berlin), Italy (Rome and Caserta), the United States (California, Virginia and Maryland), and Vatican City. The night scenes involving the skyscrapers were filmed in Shanghai, while some of the Shanghai filming was also done in Los Angeles.

Music

The film's musical score was composed by Michael Giacchino. He is the third composer to take on the series, following Danny Elfman and Hans Zimmer. The score album was released on May 9, 2006, by Varèse Sarabande Records. Unlike the previous installments, no soundtrack album featuring the film's contemporary music was released. Despite this, the film features a song by Kanye West entitled "Impossible" that also features Twista, Keyshia Cole and BJ.

Distribution

Marketing
To promote the film, Paramount rigged 4,500 randomly selected Los Angeles Times vending boxes with digital audio players which would play the theme song when the door was opened. The audio players did not always stay concealed. In many cases, they came loose and fell on top of the stack of newspapers in plain view, with the result that they were widely mistaken for bombs. Police bomb squads detonated a number of the vending boxes. They even temporarily shut down a veterans hospital in response to the apparent "threat." Despite these problems, Paramount and the Los Angeles Times opted to leave the audio players in the boxes until two days after the movie's opening.

"Trapped in the Closet" controversy

A blog entry of Hollywoodinterrupted.com in March 2006 alleged that Viacom (parent of Paramount and Comedy Central) canceled the rebroadcast of the South Park episode "Trapped in the Closet" due to threats by Cruise to refuse to participate in the Mission: Impossible III publicity circle. These assertions were soon also reported by E! News and American Morning.

Fox News attributed threats from Cruise, stating, "to back out of his Mission: Impossible III promotional duties if Viacom didn't pull a repeat of the episode", as evidence of "bad blood" between Cruise and Viacom. The Washington Post reported that South Park fans "struck back", in March 2006, and threatened to boycott Mission: Impossible III until Comedy Central put "Trapped in the Closet" back on its schedule. Melissa McNamara of CBS News later questioned whether this boycott hurt the film's box office debut. Political blogger Andrew Sullivan encouraged a boycott of the film, based on claims that Cruise allegedly forced Comedy Central to censor a South Park episode about Scientologists. "Make sure you don't go see Paramount's Mission: Impossible III, Cruise's upcoming movie," Sullivan wrote. "I know you weren't going to see it anyway. But now any money you spend on this movie is a blow against freedom of speech. Boycott it. Tell your friends to boycott it."

When asked in ABC's Primetime about his involvement with stopping the episode rebroadcast on Comedy Central, Cruise stated, "First of all, could you ever imagine sitting down with anyone? I would never sit down with someone and question them on their beliefs. Here's the thing: I'm really not even going to dignify this. I honestly didn't really even know about it. I'm working, making my movie, I've got my family. I'm busy. I don't spend my days going, 'What are people saying about me?'"

Reception

Box office

Opening in 4,054 theaters all across the United States, the fourth largest opening ever up to that point, the film topped the box office in its opening weekend. It made $16.6 million on its opening day and $47.7 million in its opening weekend, a solid opening yet almost $10 million lower than the franchise's previous films. The film remained at number one with $25 million during its second weekend, ahead of Poseidon gross of $22.2 million. The film remained in the Top 10 at the box office for the remainder of its first six weeks. It ended its initial domestic run on July 20, 2006, taking in a total of $134 million. It was the second movie in 2006 to pass the $100,000,000 mark in the box office, following Ice Age: The Meltdown. The film's domestic gross was significantly lower than that of Mission: Impossible 2, and remains the lowest of the series as of 2022.

The film grossed $70 million outside the US during its first five days (in some Asian countries, it opened two days before its North American release date). It was easily the box-office champion in many countries. Its international box office gross reached $264.4 million for a combined worldwide gross of $398.5 million, the lowest of the series as of 2022.

In the Netherlands, the film debuted at  1 in the week of May 4–10, grossing a total of € 532,384. The following week, the film remained in the top position. In its third, the film dropped to  2 and fell to  4 to the following week. Next, it maintained the  4 position to drop to  6 (in the week of June 6 - June 14). In total, the film has grossed over €2,141,162.

Critical response

On the film-critics aggregator Rotten Tomatoes, Mission: Impossible III received 71% positive reviews from critics and an average of 6.6/10, based on 224 reviews. The site's critical consensus reads, "Fast-paced, with eye-popping stunts and special effects, the latest Mission: Impossible installment delivers everything an action fan could ask for. A thrilling summer popcorn flick." It holds a similar rating on Metacritic, with an average score of 66/100, indicating "generally favorable reviews" based on a normalized average of 42 reviews. Audiences polled by CinemaScore gave the film a grade of "A−" on an A+ to F scale, an improvement on the first two installments.

On the television show Ebert & Roeper, Richard Roeper gave Mission: Impossible III a "thumbs up," while Roger Ebert gave it a marginal "thumbs down." In Ebert's print review, he gave the film a score of two and a half stars out of four, saying, "Either you want to see mindless action and computer-generated sequences executed with breakneck speed and technical precision, or you do not. I am getting to the point where I don't much care." He felt "surprised that the plot hangs together more than in the other two films."

Keith Phipps of The Onion A.V. Club said the film is "business as usual, but it's the best kind of business as usual, and it finds everyone working in top form." Owen Gleiberman of Entertainment Weekly called Mission: Impossible III "a gratifyingly clever, booby-trapped thriller that has enough fun and imagination and dash to more than justify its existence." Marc Savlov of The Austin Chronicle said that "it's all poppycock, of course, but it's done with such vim and vigor and both narrative and visual flair that you care not a jot." James Berardinelli of ReelViews gave the film a score of two and a half stars out of four, saying that it "provides lots of action, but too little excitement."

Ian Nathan of Empire said that Mission: Impossible III has "an inspired middle-hour pumped by some solid action" but added that "we now live in a post-Bourne, recalibrated-Bond universe, where Ethan Hunt looks a bit lost." Manohla Dargis of The New York Times said that "Hoffman enlivens Mission: Impossible III" but criticized the film's "maudlin romance" and "Abrams's inability to adapt his small-screen talent to a larger canvas." Rob Nelson of the Dallas Observer said that "Abrams's movie is too oppressive, too enamored of its brutality to deliver anything like real thrills; its deeply unpleasant tone nearly makes you long even for [Mission: Impossible 2 director John] Woo's cartoon absurdities."

Claudia Puig of USA Today said that "Mission: Impossible III delivers" despite "a sense that the franchise is played out and its star over-exposed." Maitland McDonagh of TV Guide described the film as "breezy, undemanding, and a carefully balanced blend of the familiar and the not-quite-what-you-expected." Lawrence Toppman of The Charlotte Observer said that Mission: Impossible III is "plenty of fun" despite being "overwrought and overplotted."

Pete Vonder Haar of Film Threat said that "you may be mildly entertained, but damned if you'll remember any of it five minutes later." Stephanie Zacharek of Salon.com said that "Cruise is the single bright, blinking emblem of the failure of Mission: Impossible III." William Arnold of the Seattle Post-Intelligencer remarked that "the latest [Mission: Impossible film] is just this side of insultingly stupid." Shawn Levy of The Oregonian said that Mission: Impossible III "feels like one of the more forgettable James Bond films—saddled, moreover, with a star who's sliding into self-parody."

Home media 
Mission: Impossible III was released on DVD, HD DVD and Blu-ray on October 30, 2006, the first film by a studio to be released simultaneously in all three formats. A 4K UHD Blu-ray release occurred on June 26, 2018.

Sequel

References

External links

 
 
 
 
 

Mission: Impossible (film series)
2006 films
2006 action thriller films
2000s spy action films
American spy action films
American action adventure films
American action thriller films
American sequel films
Cruise/Wagner Productions films
2000s English-language films
Films scored by Michael Giacchino
Films based on television series
Films directed by J. J. Abrams
Films set in Berlin
Films set in Rome
Films set in Shanghai
Films set in Vatican City
Films shot in California
Films shot in China
Films shot in Germany
Films shot in Italy
Films shot in Los Angeles
Films shot in Rome
Films shot in Virginia
Films shot in Washington, D.C.
Films with screenplays by Alex Kurtzman and Roberto Orci
Films with screenplays by J. J. Abrams
Paramount Pictures films
Films produced by Tom Cruise
Drone films
2006 directorial debut films
2000s American films